Andhra Pradesh Bhavan popularly known as AP Bhavan is a Government of Andhra Pradesh owned property in New Delhi. It has accommodation, canteen and auditorium in the premises. AP Bhavan is located on a 19.84 acres of land in New Delhi. It has suites for the Governor and the Chief Minister apart from other rooms.

History
AP Bhavan belongs to the state of Andhra Pradesh, when the state was formed by the Government of India. The AP Bhavan came into being in 1956 after merging major portion of Hyderabad state with erstwhile Andhra state on linguistics basis.

References

External links
 Official website

Government of Andhra Pradesh
State governments' houses in Delhi
Official residences in India